Jasen is a settlement immediately southeast of Ilirska Bistrica in the Inner Carniola region of Slovenia.

Mass graves

Jasen is the site of five known mass graves or unmarked graves from the Second World War. Four of them contain the remains of German soldiers from the 97th Corps that fell at the beginning of May 1945. The Jasen Mass Grave encompasses three sites  from the house at Jasen no. 1a. They contain the remains of 84, eight, and six soldiers, respectively. The Jasen No. 11 Mass Grave lies in the yard of the house at Jasen no. 11a. It contains the remains of three or four soldiers. The Church Grave is located by an electric pole between the house at Jasen no. 16a and the church. It contains the remains of one soldier. The Jasen No. 4 Grave lies in the yard of the house at Jasen no. 4. It contains the remains of one soldier. It contains the remains of two Chetniks accidentally shot by German troops.

Church
The small church in the settlement is dedicated to Saint Joachim and belongs to the Parish of Ilirska Bistrica.

References

External links
Jasen on Geopedia

Populated places in the Municipality of Ilirska Bistrica